Pattani (Jawi: , , , Malay: Patani) is one of the southern provinces of Thailand. Neighboring provinces are (from southeast clockwise) Narathiwat, Yala, and Songkhla.  Its capital is the town of Pattani.

Geography
Pattani is on the Malay Peninsula, with the coast of the Gulf of Thailand to the north. The south is dominated by the Sankalakhiri mountain range, which includes Budo-Su-ngai Padi National Park, on the border with Yala and Narathiwat.

National parks
There are two national parks, along with three other national parks, make up region 6 (Pattani branch) of Thailand's protected areas. 
 Budo–Su-ngai Padi National Park, 
 Namtok Sai Khao National Park,

Toponym
The name Pattani is the Thai adaptation of the Malay name Patani (Jawi: ڤتاني), which can mean "this beach" in Patani Malay language. (In standard Malay, this would be pantai ini.)  According to legend, the founder of Patani went hunting and saw an albino mouse-deer the size of a goat, which then disappeared. He enquired where the animal had gone, and his men replied: "Pata ni lah!" ("this beach!") They searched for the mouse-deer but found instead an old man, who said his name was Che' Tani. The raja later ordered a town be built on the site where the mouse-deer had disappeared, and it is therefore believed that the town was named either after the beach or the old man. Another suggestion is that it derives from a Sanskrit word pathini, meaning "virgin nymph"; Pathini was the name of a daughter of Merong Mahawangsa, founder of the preceding Langkasuka Empire.

History

Historically, Pattani province was the centre of the Malay Sultanate of Patani Darul Makrif. For centuries a tributary state of Siam, Patani has been governed by Siam since its conquest in 1786.  The provinces of Patani were turned into seven smaller provinces: Patani, Nhongchik, Raman, Ra-ngae, Saiburi, Yala and Yaring, later regrouped in 1906 into 4 larger provinces: Patani, Bangnara, Saiburi and Yala.  Siamese rule was officially acknowledged by the Burney Treaty of 1826 negotiated with the British Empire which included also Kedah, Kelantan, Perlis and Terengganu. Unlike these four sultanates, Patani was not included in the Anglo-Siamese Treaty of 1909 and remained under Siamese rule. Both Yala (Jala) and Narathiwat (Menara) were originally part of Patani, but were made provinces in their own right during the territorial administrative reform and the creation of a united centralized Siam state in the early-20th century.

Demographics

Pattani is one of the four provinces of Thailand where the majority of the population are Muslim, the others being Yala, Narathiwat, and Satun. In the 2014 census, the Muslim population made up roughly 88 percent of the population. This is mainly due to the people of Malay ancestry, and large portion of Pattani Malay speakers (though most speak Thai as well).

Symbols
The seal of the province shows the cannon called Phraya Tani, known as Sri Pattani in Malay, which was cast in Pattani province. It was brought to Bangkok in 1785, and is now on display in front of the Ministry of Defence in Bangkok.

The provincial flower is the Chinese hibiscus (Hibiscus rosa-sinensis), and the provincial tree is the Ironwood (Hopea odorata).

Administrative divisions

Provincial government
Pattani is divided into 12 districts (amphoe), which are further divided into 115 subdistricts (tambon) and 629 villages (muban).
The districts of Chana (Malay: Chenok), Thepa (Malay:Tiba) and Saba Yoi (Malay:Sebayu) were detached from Pattani and transferred to Songkhla in 1796 by Siam government.

Local government

As of 26 November 2019 there are: one Pattani Provincial Administration Organisation and 17 municipal (thesaban) areas in the province. Pattani and Taluban have town (thesaban mueang) status. Further 15 subdistrict municipalities (thesaban tambon). The non-municipal areas are administered by 96 Subdistrict Administrative Organisations - SAO (ongkan borihan suan tambon).

Economy
Six of Pattani's districts lie on the shore of the Gulf of Thailand. The number of fisheries workers in Pattani exceeds 80,000 . Pattani is the only province in Thailand where the agriculture ministry prohibits trawlers and destructive fishing nets within four nautical miles of the shoreline. Local fish stocks have rebounded as a result.

Despite having many interesting places. But Pattani is the least visited province in the country according to data from Ministry of Tourism and Sports in 2018, the number of tourists is only 20,000–30,000 people, mostly Thai people.

Transport
The Royal Thai Air Force's Pattani Airport is used for counter-insurgency operations in the area. It does not run public flights. Pattani's main railway stop is Pattani Railway Station.

Human achievement index 2017

Since 2003, United Nations Development Programme (UNDP) in Thailand has tracked progress on human development at sub-national level using the Human achievement index (HAI), a composite index covering all the eight key areas of human development. National Economic and Social Development Board (NESDB) has taken over this task since 2017.

Military rule
, the provisions of Thailand's Internal Security Act remain imposed on Mae Lan District. Internal security restrictions, maintained by Thailand's Internal Security Operations Command can result in curfews, prohibited entry, or prohibited transport of goods. It is considered one step below the imposition of full martial law.

Places of interest

Pattani has named as the land of three religions (Buddhism, Islam, Chinese religion). There are important places of worship for all three religions:
Wat Rat Burana, also known as Wat Chang Hai, an ancient Thai Buddhist temple older than 300 years, a legendary monk Luang Pu Thuat was once the abbot of this place.
 Leng Chu Kiang Shrine Chinese shrine of Lim Ko Niao (younger sister of Lin Daoqian).
 Krue Se Mosque Regarded as one of the more famous mosques with the oldest history.

See also
2007 South Thailand bombings
Patani (historical region)
South Thailand insurgency

References

External links

Pattani province website (Thai)
Tourism Authority of Thailand (TAT): Pattani

Pattani Erupts 
Thailand Islamic Insurgency
Muslim rebels light fuse in Thailand

 
Provinces of Thailand
Southern Thailand
Gulf of Thailand